The Trumpeting Place inscription is an inscribed stone from the  1st century CE discovered in 1968 by Benjamin Mazar in his early excavations of the southern wall of the Temple Mount. The stone, showing just two complete words written in the Square Hebrew alphabet, was carved above a wide depression cut into the inner face of the stone. The first word is translated as "to the place" and the second word "of trumpeting" or "of blasting" or "of blowing", giving the phrase "To the Trumpeting Place". The subsequent words of the inscription are cut off. The third word (...לה), which is incomplete, has been interpreted as either "declare" or "distinguish", giving either: "to d[eclare (the Sabbath)]" or "to d[istinguish (between the sacred and the profane)]", where the words in square brackets represent scholarly conjecture.

The inscription is believed to be a directional sign for the priests who blew a trumpet announcing the beginning and end of the Shabbat in the Second Temple period. It is thought to have fallen from the southwest corner of the Temple Mount to the street below prior to its discovery. It has been connected to a passage in Josephus's The Jewish War (IV, ix, 12) in which he describes a part of the Temple: "the point where it was custom for one of the priests to stand and to give notice, by sound of trumpet, in the afternoon of the approach, and on the following evening of the close, of every seventh day".

The inscribed stone was probably thrown over after the destruction of the Temple and city in 70 CE, where it remained for almost 1900 years until Mazar found it.

Text

Gallery

See also
List of artifacts significant to the Bible

References

Further reading

 

1st-century inscriptions
1968 archaeological discoveries
Hebrew inscriptions
Archaeology of Israel
Ancient Near East steles
Archaeological discoveries in the West Bank
Temple Mount